St. James Elementary School may refer to:
St. James Elementary School (Louisville)
St. James Elementary School (Myrtle Beach)
St. James Elementary School (New York City)